In the Wee Wee Hours... is a 1987 American short documentary film directed by Izak Ben-Meir about homeless people in Los Angeles.

Accolades
It was nominated for an Academy Award for Best Documentary Short.

References

External links

BFI

1987 films
1987 short films
1987 documentary films
American short documentary films
1980s short documentary films
American independent films
Documentary films about homelessness in the United States
Documentary films about Los Angeles
1987 independent films
1980s English-language films
1980s American films